Jesus Ernesto Gonzales Jr (born October 3, 1984) is a Mexican-American former professional boxer. Gonzales was the NABF and IBF North American Super Middleweight Champion. Gonzales was considered by boxing critics to be one of the top amateur medal contenders for the United States in the 2004 Summer Olympics.

Amateur career
Gonzales' decorated amateur career includes wins over 2004 Olympic Gold Medalist and later WBA World Super Middleweight Champion Andre Ward; WBO Light Middleweight Champion Alfredo Angulo; IBA Intercontinental Light Middleweight champion Sechew Powell; and an astonishing four wins over former WBC Welterweight Champion Andre Berto.

In addition, Gonzales won the National Boxing Championship in the middleweight division in 2002, including the Outstanding Boxer Award.

Professional career
Widely considered to be America's top medal contender for the 2004 Olympic Games, Gonzales stunned fans on June 12, 2003 when he decided to bypass the games and turn pro at the age of 18. Signing to Top Rank under promoter Bob Arum for $30,000, with another $30,000 from manager Cameron Dunkin. Gonzales was touted as the next Oscar De La Hoya. Over the next two years Gonzales fought 17 fights including two of the fastest knockouts in the history of boxing: 16 seconds over Josh Peters and a 17 seconds over Bobby Green while climbing to a 17-0 record.

Against the advice of his trainer/father on September 17, 2005 Gonzales became one of the youngest fighters ever (age 20) to fight for the Vacant IBC Middleweight Title. Gonzales suffered an eighth round knockout by former IBC Middleweight Champion José Luis Zertuche.

After this crucial fight, Top Rank's Peter McKinn climbed into the ring and had a short conversation with Jesus' trainer/father Ernie Gonzales Sr. That conversation ended with Ernie Gonzales Sr. delivering a left hook to the side of McKinn's face.

Jesus was unable to get a fight for nearly a year but had vowed to avenge his loss. He finally got the opportunity August 18, 2005 against Fernando Vela. Six victories later, Jesús found himself fighting for the Interim WBC Continental Americas Light Middleweight title on May 1, 2008. With a 12 round unanimous decision, Jesus became the WBC Continental Americas Light Middleweight Champion at the age of 22  with a record of 24-1.

Several weeks later, Jesus signed his second contract with Star Boxing in New York. With Star holding the rights to Jesus over his head and refusing to pay him, Jesus was forced into a two-year hiatus. For the second time in his career, his climb to the top was shattered over a bad contract and Jesus was forced to resign his WBC Continental Americas Light Middleweight title because of non-defense. Crushed and struggling to support his son, Jesús was forced to take a security job at a local high school to make ends meet.

Gonzales was discovered by Fan Base promotions while they were on a trip to Arizona to train one of their prized Canadian fighters. He was at a local gym tearing up the speed bag and Fan Base immediately noticed his outstanding talent. Fan Base put up the money and legal team to release Gonzales from his Star contract and immediately got him a fight in Canada against top Canadian contender Jason Naugler. After TKO’ing Naugler in the second round, Jesús was granted an opportunity to fight for the IBF N. American Super Middleweight Title in his hometown of Phoenix, Arizona.

In March 2011, Jesus defeated Dhafir Smith in a unanimous decision to become the IBF North American Super Middleweight Champion. He was only 26 years old then and vowed not to stop until he achieved a World Title.

NABF Super Middleweight Championship
Jesus became the new NABF Super Middleweight Champion, by beating tough veteran Francisco Sierra on July 8, 2011 at US Airways Center in Phoenix, Arizona. This bout was televised on ESPN2. In the fight there were two knockdowns, one by each fighter. Gonzales was named the winner by unanimous decision after 12 rounds.

IBF Inter-Continental Super Middleweight Championship

In 2012, Adonis Stevenson brutally knocked out González in the first round with his signature straight left hand. The knock out was a candidate for KO of the year by Ring Magazine. Prior to the fight, González famously had exposed Stevenson's criminal past. This would turn out to be González last ever fight.

Professional record

|- style="margin:0.5em auto; font-size:95%;"
|align="center" colspan=8|27 Wins (14 knockouts), 2 Losses, 0 Draw
|- style="margin:0.5em auto; font-size:95%;"
|align=center style="border-style: none none solid solid; background: #e3e3e3"|Res.
|align=center style="border-style: none none solid solid; background: #e3e3e3"|Record
|align=center style="border-style: none none solid solid; background: #e3e3e3"|Opponent
|align=center style="border-style: none none solid solid; background: #e3e3e3"|Type
|align=center style="border-style: none none solid solid; background: #e3e3e3"|Rd., Time
|align=center style="border-style: none none solid solid; background: #e3e3e3"|Date
|align=center style="border-style: none none solid solid; background: #e3e3e3"|Venue and Location
|align=center style="border-style: none none solid solid; background: #e3e3e3"|Notes
|-align=center

|-align=center
|Loss || 27-2||align=left|Adonis Stevenson
|KO || 1 , (1:39) || February 18, 2012 ||align=left|Bell Centre, Canada
|align=left|For vacant IBF Inter-Continental
|-align=center
|Win || 27-1 ||align=left|Francisco Sierra
|UD || 12  || July 8, 2011 ||align=left|US Airways Center, Phoenix, Arizona
|align=left|Won NABF super middleweight title
|-align=center
|Win|| 26-1||align=left|Dhafir Smith
|UD || 12  || March 15, 2011 ||align=left|Celebrity Theatre, Phoenix, Arizona
|align=left|Won IBF North American super middleweight title
|-align=center
|Win|| 25-1||align=left|Jason Naugler
|TKO || 2 , (3:00) ||  ||align=left|Commonwealth Center, Calgary, Alberta, Canada
|align=left|
|-align=center
|Win || 24-1||align=left|Durrell Richardson
|UD || 12  || May 1, 2008 ||align=left|Arena Theatre, Houston, Texas
|align=left|
|-align=center
|Win  || 23-1||align=left|Joshua Smith
|TKO || 2 , (2:16) || December 20, 2007 ||align=left|Convention Center, Pasadena, Texas
|align=left|
|-align=center
|Win || 22-1 ||align=left|Anthony Greeley 
|KO || 1 , (2:34) || June 9, 2007 ||align=left|Convention Center, Pasadena, Texas
|align=left|
|-align=center
|Win || 21-1||align=left|Marcos Primera
|UD || 10  || January 20, 2007 ||align=left|Celebrity Theatre, Phoenix, Arizona
|align=left|
|-align=center
|Win || 20-1  ||align=left|Darnell Boone
|UD || 8  || December 15, 2006 ||align=left|Grand Plaza Hotel, Houston, Texas
|align=left|
|-align=center
|Win || 19-1  ||align=left|Ramon Espinoza
|TKO || 3 , (2:32) || September 22, 2006 ||align=left|Convention Center, Pasadena, Texas
|align=left|
|-align=center
|Win || 18-1  ||align=left|Fernando Vela
|UD || 6  || August 18, 2006 ||align=left|Las Vegas Hilton, Las Vegas, Nevada
|align=left|
|-align=center
|Loss || 17-1-0 ||align=left|José Luis Zertuche
|TKO || 8 , (2:02) || September 17, 2005 ||align=left|America West Arena, Phoenix, Arizona
|align=left|For vacant IBC middleweight title
|-align=center
|Win || 17-0-0 ||align=left|Dumont Welliver
|UD || 8  || May 28, 2005 ||align=left|Staples Center, Los Angeles
|align=left|
|-align=center
|Win  || 16-0-0 ||align=left|Kendall Gould
|TKO || 4 , (0:10) || May 6, 2005 ||align=left|Fort McDowell Casino, Fountain Hills, Arizona
|align=left|
|-align=center
|Win || 15-0-0 ||align=left|Chance Leggett 
|UD || 8  || April 8, 2005 ||align=left|Fort McDowell Casino, Fountain Hills, Arizona
|align=left|
|-align=center
|Win || 14-0-0 ||align=left|Alberto Mercedes
|UD || 8  || February 18, 2005 ||align=left|Fort McDowell Casino, Fountain Hills, Arizona
|align=left|
|-align=center
|Win || 13-0-0 ||align=left|Abdias Castillo
|TKO || 2 , (1:36) || January 7, 2005 ||align=left|Veteran's Memorial Coliseum, Phoenix, Arizona
|align=left|
|-align=center
|Win || 12-0-0 ||align=left|Jorge Garcia
|TKO || 4 , (2:05) || December 3, 2004 ||align=left|Entertainment Center, Laredo, Texas
|align=left|
|-align=center
|Win || 11-0-0 ||align=left|Shay Mobley
|UD || 6  || August 27, 2004 ||align=left|Dodge Theater, Phoenix, Arizona
|align=left|
|-align=center
|Win || 10-0-0 ||align=left|Chris Grays
|DQ || 4 , (1:36) || June 18, 2004 ||align=left|Dodge Theater, Phoenix, Arizona
|align=left|
|-align=center
|Win || 9-0-0 ||align=left|Francisco Mendez
|UD || 6  || May 14, 2004 ||align=left|Dodge Theater, Phoenix, Arizona
|align=left|
|-align=center
|Win  || 8-0-0 ||align=left|Chris Grays
|UD || 6  || March 26, 2004 ||align=left|Dodge Theater, Phoenix, Arizona
|align=left|
|-align=center
|Win || 7-0-0 ||align=left|Vincent Moses 
|TKO || 4 , (1:39) || January 31, 2004 ||align=left|Dodge Theater, Phoenix, Arizona
|align=left|
|-align=center
|Win || 6-0-0 ||align=left|Nathan Martin
|TKO || 4 , (2:09) || December 5, 2003 ||align=left|Dodge Theater, Phoenix, Arizona
|align=left|
|-align=center
|Win || 5-0-0 ||align=left|Craig Oxley
|TKO || 1 , (2:51) || October 31, 2003 ||align=left|Park ‘N Swap, Phoenix, Arizona
|align=left|
|-align=center
|Win || 4-0-0 ||align=left|Roy Smith
|TKO || 1 , (2:35) || October 17, 2003 ||align=left|Celebrity Theatre, Phoenix, Arizona
|align=left|
|-align=center
|Win || 3-0-0 ||align=left|Bobby Green
|TKO || 1 , (0:17) || October 10, 2003 ||align=left|Desert Diamond Casino, Tucson, Arizona
|align=left|
|-align=center
|Win || 2-0-0 ||align=left|Joshua Peters
|KO || 1 , (0:26) || October 4, 2003 ||align=left|Staples Center, Los Angeles
|align=left|
|-align=center
|Win || 1-0-0 ||align=left|Rawley Wilson
|KO || 1 , (0:59) || August 25, 2003 ||align=left|Celebrity Theatre, Phoenix, Arizona
|align=left|
|-align=center

References

External links

American boxers of Mexican descent
Boxers from Arizona
Sportspeople from Phoenix, Arizona
Winners of the United States Championship for amateur boxers
1984 births
Living people
American male boxers
Middleweight boxers